Pierre-Arnoul Frédéric Guy Donat de Marneffe is a Belgian computer scientist and professor emeritus at the University of Liège (ULg). He studied civil engineering (mechanics section) at the Faculté polytechnique de Mons (FPMs) and obtained a PhD in applied sciences at the ULg (1976), in addition he obtained a Ph.D. in Computer science at Cambridge University in 1982.

His ideas expressed in Holon Programming inspired Donald Knuth in creating WEB, the first published literate programming environment.

References
 Pierre-Arnoul de Marneffe, Holon Programming. Univ. de Liège, Service d'Informatique (December, 1973).

External links 
 University of Liège
 Literate programming
 Montefiore institute's Pierre Arnoul de Marneffe's personal web page

Belgian computer scientists
Walloon people
University of Liège alumni
Living people
Year of birth missing (living people)